Physocypria is a genus of ostracods belonging to the family Candonidae. The species of this genus are found in Europe, Africa, south-eastern Asia and North America.

Taxonomy
The following species are recognised in the genus Physocypria:
 Physocypria bullata Vávra, 1897 
 Physocypria globula Furtos, 1933 
 Physocypria pustulosa (Sharpe, 1897) 
 Physocypria schubarti Farkas, 1958

References

Podocopida
Podocopida genera